The 32nd District of the Iowa House of Representatives in the state of Iowa.

Current elected officials
Ruth Ann Gaines is the representative currently representing the district.

Past representatives
The district has previously been represented by:
 Richard W. Welden, 1971–1973
 Kenneth D. Miller, 1973–1982
 Paul Copenhaver, 1982–1983
 Roger Halvorson, 1983–1997
 Roger Thomas, 1997–2001
 Leigh Rekow, 2001–2003
 Steven Lukan, 2003–2013
 Ruth Ann Gaines, 2013–present

References

032